Warren is a former Amtrak railroad station in the city of Warren, Jo Daviess County, Illinois, United States. Located at the intersection of Railroad Street and Burnett Avenue in Warren, the station served the Black Hawk from February 13, 1974, to September 30, 1981. The station consisted of one side platform with a depot, which has since been demolished. Service continued until April 30, 1971, when the Hawkeye (Waterloo–Chicago) was discontinued on the day before Amtrak began passenger service.

Bibliography

References

External links
Warren, Illinois– TrainWeb

Former Amtrak stations in Illinois
Former Illinois Central Railroad stations
1854 establishments in Illinois
Railway stations in the United States opened in 1854
Railway stations closed in 1981